The 2013 Australian motorcycle Grand Prix was the sixteenth round of the 2013 MotoGP season. It was held at the Phillip Island Grand Prix Circuit in Phillip Island on 20 October 2013.

The MotoGP race was originally scheduled to run over 27 laps, but was shortened to 19 laps after Bridgestone announced that the safety of its tyres on the newly resurfaced track could not be guaranteed after 10 laps. Riders were required to make a pitstop to swap bikes or change tyres at least once during the race, and no rider was permitted to use the same set of tyres for more than 10 laps. Marc Márquez and Bryan Staring were both disqualified for riding an 11-lap stint without pitting. Jorge Lorenzo won the race and closed up the gap to Márquez in the championship to 18 points. The Moto2 race distance was also shortened, from 25 to 13 laps.

Classification

MotoGP

 Marc Márquez and Bryan Staring were both black-flagged for pitting to change to their second bikes outside of the designated window.

Moto2

Moto3

Championship standings after the race (MotoGP)
Below are the standings for the top five riders and constructors after round sixteen has concluded.

Riders' Championship standings

Constructors' Championship standings

 Note: Only the top five positions are included for both sets of standings.

References

Australian motorcycle Grand Prix
Australian
Motorcycle
Motorsport at Phillip Island
Australian motorcycle Grand Prix